Martin Gamboš (born 23 January 1998) is a Slovak professional footballer who plays as a midfielder for Swedish club Västerås SK.

Club career

Žilina
Gamboš made his Fortuna Liga debut for Žilina against Ružomberok on 4 August 2018.

Senica
Despite being a local player at Žilina, Gamboš was swapped for Tenton Yenne as he transferred to Senica. Gamboš had signed a two-year contract with a one-year further option with the club. He cited lack of opportunities and interest at MŠK as the main reasons for his transfer.

ViOn Zlaté Moravce
In June 2021, Gamboš signed a two-year contract with Zlaté Moravce. He made his debut on 23 July in a 4–0 away loss to AS Trenčín, coming on as a first-half substitute for Martin Tóth.

Viktoria 1889 Berlin
On 1 February 2022, Gamboš joined Viktoria 1889 Berlin in the German 3. Liga.

References

External links
 MŠK Žilina official club profile 
 
 Futbalnet profile 
 

1998 births
Sportspeople from Žilina
Living people
Slovak footballers
Slovakia youth international footballers
Slovakia under-21 international footballers
Association football midfielders
TSV 1860 Munich players
MŠK Žilina players
FC Spartak Trnava players
FK Senica players
FC ViOn Zlaté Moravce players
FC Viktoria 1889 Berlin players
Västerås SK Fotboll players
Bayernliga players
Regionalliga players
2. Liga (Slovakia) players
Slovak Super Liga players
3. Liga players
Superettan players
Slovak expatriate footballers
Expatriate footballers in Germany
Slovak expatriate sportspeople in Germany
Expatriate footballers in Sweden
Slovak expatriate sportspeople in Sweden